Haga is a village in Samnanger municipality in Vestland county, Norway. The village is located the northeastern end of the Samnangerfjorden. It is located east of the village of Årland, across the fjord. The municipal centre of Tysse lies immediately south of Haga, and it is considered part of the "urban area" of Haga. Haga Church was built in the centre of the village in 1995.

References

Villages in Vestland
Samnanger